Baron Ferdinand Friedrich Georg Ludwig von Wrangel (tr. ;  – ) was a Baltic German explorer and officer in the Imperial Russian Navy, Honorable Member of the Saint Petersburg Academy of Sciences, a founder of the Russian Geographic Society. He is best known as chief manager of the Russian-American Company, in fact governor of the Russian settlements in present-day Alaska.

In English texts, Wrangel is sometimes spelled Vrangel, a transliteration from Russian, which more closely represents its pronunciation in German, or Wrangell.

Biography
Wrangel was born in Pskov, into the noble Baltic German Wrangel family and was a distant nephew of Generalfeldmarschall Friedrich von Wrangel. He graduated from the Naval Cadets College in 1815. He participated in Vasily Golovnin's world cruise on the ship Kamchatka in 1817–1819 and belonged to the cohort of Baltic-German navigators who were instrumental in Imperial Russia's maritime explorations.

Kolymskaya expedition
He was appointed in 1820 to command the Kolymskaya expedition to explore the Russian polar seas. Sailing from St. Petersburg, he arrived at Nizhnekolymsk on 2 November 1820, and early in 1821 journeyed to Cape Shelagskiy on sledges drawn by dogs. He sailed afterward up Kolyma River, advancing about 125 miles into the interior, through territory inhabited by the Yakuts. On 10 March 1822, he resumed his journey northward, and traveled 46 days on the ice, reaching 72° 2' north latitude. He left Nizhnekolymsk on 1 November 1823, and returned to St. Petersburg on 15 August 1824.

He established that north of the Kolyma River and Cape Shelagsky there was an open sea, not dry land, as people thought. Together with Fyodor Matyushkin and P. Kuzmin, Wrangel described the Siberian coastline from the Indigirka River to the Kolyuchinskaya Bay in the Chukchi Sea. (See Northeast Passage.) His expedition made a valuable research in glaciology, geomagnetics, and climatology and also collected data about natural resources and native population of that remote area.

Krotky world voyage
Having been promoted to commander, Wrangel led the Russian world voyage on the ship Krotky in 1825–1827.

Governor of Russian Alaska
He was appointed chief manager of the Russian-American Company in 1829, effectively governor of its settlements in North America (present day Alaska).  Wrangel was the first of a series of bachelor appointees to the office of governor who had to find a wife before assuming the duties in America, the Russian American Company rules having been changed in 1829. Prior to his departure for Russia's American colonies, he was married to Elisabeth Theodora Natalie Karoline de Rossillon, daughter of Baron Wilhelm de Rossillon.

He traveled to his post early in 1829, by way of Siberia and Kamchatka. After thoroughly reforming the administration, he introduced the cultivation of the potato, opened and regulated the working of several mines, and urged upon the home government the organization of a fur company. He promoted investment, and sent out missionaries. He began a survey of the country, opened roads, built bridges and government buildings. He made geographical and ethnographical observations, which he embodied in a memoir to the navy department. Recalled in 1834, he returned by way of the Isthmus of Panama and the United States, where he visited several cities.

Admiral
Wrangel was promoted to rear admiral in 1837, and made director of the ship-timber department in the navy office, which he held for twelve years. He became vice-admiral in 1847, but resigned in 1849, and temporarily severed his connection with the navy to assume the presidency of the newly reorganized Russian-American Company. Wrangel had been a member of the board of directors of the Russian-American Company from 1840 to 1849.

In 1854 he re-entered active service and was made chief director of the hydrographical department of the navy  He was the Minister of the Navy 1855–1857.

Retirement and death
Wrangel retired in 1864. He opposed the sale of Alaska to the United States in 1867. Wrangel wrote the book Journey along the northern coastline of Siberia and the Arctic Ocean and other books about the peoples of northwestern America.

He lived in his last years in Ruil (Roela in Estonian) in the eastern part of Estonia. He had bought the manor in 1840. He died in Dorpat, Livonia.

Writings
An account of the physical observations during his first journey was published in German (Berlin, 1827), and also in German extracts from Wrangel's journals, Reise längs der Nordküste von Sibirien und auf dem Eismeere in den Jahren 1820-1824 (2 vols., Berlin, 1839), which was translated into English as Wrangell's Expedition to the Polar Sea (2 vols., London, 1840). The complete report of the expedition appeared as "Puteshestvie po severnym beregam Sibiri, po Ledovitomu Moryu, sovershennoe v 1820, 1821, 1822, 1823 i 1824 godakh" (2 vols., St. Petersburg, 1841), and was translated into French with notes by Prince Galitzin, under the title Voyage sur les côtes septentrionales de la Sibérie et de la mer glaciale (2 vols., 1841). From the French version of the complete report an English one was made under the title A Journey on the Northern Coast of Siberia and the Icy Sea (2 vols., London, 1841). The book influenced Charles Darwin's thinking on animal navigation, leading him to propose that humans and animals possess an innate ability for dead reckoning. Darwin wrote:

Wrangel also published:
 Ocherk puti iz Sitki v Sankt-Peterburg (Report of Travel from Sitka to St. Petersburg) (1836)
 French translation: Journal de voyage de Sitka à Saint Pétersbourg (Paris, 1836)
 English translation prepared from the French: Journal of a Voyage from Sitka to St. Petersburg (London, 1837)
 Nachrichten über die Russischen Besitzungen an der Nordwestküste America's (2 vols., St. Petersburg, 1839)
 French translation: Renseignements statistiques et ethnographiques sur les possessions Russes de la côte Nord-Ouest de l'Amérique (Paris, 1839)
 English translation: Statistical and Ethnographical Notices on the Russian Possessions in North America (London, 1841)

List of places named after Wrangel
Wrangel Island, the arctic island north of Chukotka, named by Thomas Long after him. Wrangel had noticed swarms of birds flying north, and, questioning the native population, he determined that there must be an undiscovered island in the Arctic Ocean. He searched for it on the Kolymskaya expedition, but failed to find it.
Wrangell Island, an island in the Alexander Archipelago, off the coast of Alaska
Wrangell, Alaska, a city on Wrangell Island and one of the oldest non-native settlements in Alaska
Fort Wrangel, a US Army base at Wrangell, originally Fort Stikine when under British control
Wrangell Airport, an airport near Wrangell, Alaska
Wrangell-Petersburg Census Area a census area containing Wrangell Island.
Wrangell Narrows, a winding channel in the Alexander Archipelago
Cape Wrangell of Attu Island, the westernmost point of Alaska (and the United States)
Mount Wrangell, a volcano in Alaska
Wrangell Volcanic Field, named after Mount Wrangell
Wrangell Mountains, named after Mount Wrangell
USS Wrangell (AE-12), named after Mount Wrangell
Wrangell-St. Elias National Park and Preserve, named after Wrangell mountains
Wrangellia, a geologic terrane of Southeast Alaska

See also
 List of Baltic German explorers

References

External links
 Overview of Roela (in German: Ruil) (the landed estate of the Wrangels) in Estonian Manors Portal
 Wrangell's 1839 Comparative Word-List of Alaskan languages

1796 births
1870 deaths
People from Pskov
People from Pskovsky Uyezd
Baltic-German people
Barons of the Russian Empire
Russian and Soviet polar explorers
Explorers from the Russian Empire
Estonian explorers
Imperial Russian Navy admirals
Governors of the Russian-American Company
Circumnavigators of the globe
Corresponding members of the Saint Petersburg Academy of Sciences
Honorary members of the Saint Petersburg Academy of Sciences
Explorers of the Arctic
19th-century explorers
Members of the State Council (Russian Empire)
Chukchi Sea
Demidov Prize laureates
Founding members of the Russian Geographical Society
Ferdinand
Naval Cadet Corps alumni